The General Post Office (abbreviated: GPO) in Brisbane, Queensland, in Australia is a heritage-listed post office located at 261 Queen Street in 1872 and extended through to Elizabeth Street in 1908. It is still in use by Australia Post. Opposite the GPO building is Post Office Square.

History

The first full-time postmaster in Brisbane was J. E. Barney in 1852. In 1862, the first Postmaster-General for the state of Queensland Thomas Lodge Murray Prior was appointed.  A small convict era building was used as for postal services but was too far from the telegraph office. The Postmaster-General choose a half hectare site which was centrally located.

The building already located at the Queen Street site which once hosted women convicts was demolished in 1871. 

Freestone and bricks were sourced from local materials.  The GPO was opened on 28 September 1872. In 1873, the Queensland Museum was housed in the General Post Office building, but moved in 1879 to the William Street building.  In the same year a second wing, which was constructed by John Petrie was completed which allowed the telegraph office to move to the building, pleasing business customers.

The building features deep verandahs and high ceilings. A clock mounted in the pediment positioned above the main entrance was once illuminated by a gas powered light.  It was replaced by a smaller, electric clock.  The first typewriter to be used in any post office in any Australian city was used at the GPO in 1892.  Stamps and money orders were once available to customers outside the building via windows are now closed.

The building has been listed on the Brisbane City Council Heritage Register.

Gallery

See also
 Other General Post Offices

References

External links

 Further historical details 
 General Post Office, Brisbane Discovery Queensland Buildings website

Brisbane
Buildings and structures in Brisbane
Government buildings completed in 1872
1872 establishments in Australia
Commonwealth Heritage List places in Queensland
Italianate architecture in Brisbane
Neoclassical architecture in Australia
Brisbane Local Heritage Register
Brisbane central business district
Francis Drummond Greville Stanley buildings
Queen Street, Brisbane